Hibiscus Coast busway station is a bus station that is closely associated with Auckland's Northern Busway in New Zealand. It is the northern terminus for services that run via the busway, but the busway lanes do not yet extend north to it. It is located on the Hibiscus Coast Highway a few hundred metres south-west of the village of Silverdale.

The station, already operating as Silverdale Park and Ride, was opened to Northern Express busway services in 2015. It has shelters, electronic real-time information, and park and ride parking. It is a hub for bus services to Waiwera, Orewa, Gulf Harbour, Manly and, from 2018, Warkworth.

Auckland Transport began an expansion of the site on 20 March 2017 to increase parking from over 200 to 484 spaces, with another 127 planned.

The next station southbound is Albany busway station. There are plans to extend the busway lanes to Albany Station and Hibiscus Coast Station from Constellation Station, and proposals to extend them further north to Orewa.

Buses travelling via Hibiscus Coast Station include double decker buses on the Northern Express NX1 route.

History 
A Silverdale Park and Ride Station opened sometime before 2011 and was served by local bus routes.

In 2014, Auckland Transport released plans for a new bus network for the Hibiscus Coast. As part of this, it was proposed that Northern Express services would be extended to the Hibiscus Coast. A new bus station was to be built at the current Park and Ride to serve as an interchange between Northern Express and local bus services. The station was expected to be similar to the Albany busway station, with the number of car parks increasing from 100 to 500. The new network was expected to be implemented in mid-2015, however, the new station was not expected to be operational until mid-2016. In order to facilitate transfers in the interim, temporary bus stops and shelters were to be placed on Painton Road beside the existing Park and Ride as opposed to the Hibiscus Coast Highway where they had been previously. AT used this as an opportunity to trial new bus shelter designs.

Services
As of 20 February 2020, the following bus routes serve Hibiscus Coast station: NX1, 128, 981, 982, 983, 984, 985, 986, 995.

Facilities 
The station has a carpark that is open 24 hours a day and has over 600 spaces available. The main building has culturally significant artwork, a retail kiosk, bicycle facilities, and machines for topping up AT HOP smartcards.

See also
Penlink – a proposed bypass highway in the area

References

External links
Northern Busway Map
Timetable and route
Layout and expansion plans

Northern Busway, Auckland
Bus stations in New Zealand
Transport buildings and structures in the Auckland Region